Keep 'Em Flying is a 1941 film starring the comedy team of Abbott and Costello. The film was their third service comedy based on the peacetime draft of 1940. The comedy team had appeared in two previous service comedies in 1941, before the United States entered the war: Buck Privates, released in January, and In the Navy, released in May. Flying Cadets, along with  Keep 'Em Flying were both produced by Universal Pictures in 1941.

The film's title is taken from the official motto of the U.S. Army Air Corps, some five months after it had been reformed into the USAAF. Keep 'Em Flying reflected the "spirit of the times" and encouraged many young men to volunteer for flight training."

Plot
Jinx Roberts, an arrogant but talented stunt pilot, and his assistants Blackie and Heathcliff, are fired from a carnival air show after a disagreement with the owner.  Jinx decides to join the Army Air Corps, and he, Blackie and Heathcliff go to a nightclub to party one last time. Jinx falls for the club's singer, Linda Joyce. Coincidentally, she leaves her job to become a USO hostess at the same Academy where Jinx and her brother, Jimmy, are enrolled.

Jinx's instructor at the Academy turns out to be Craig Morrison, his co-pilot on a commercial aircraft years earlier, and the two still hold animosity for each other. Meanwhile, Blackie and Heathcliff persuade a colonel to allow them to join the Air Corps as ground crewman. They fall in love with twin USO hostesses.

Jinx hatches a plan to help Jimmy solo by abandoning him in mid-air. Jimmy is nearly killed landing the plane. Linda deplores Jinx for his ill-conceived actions and he, along with Blackie and Heathcliff, who have had several mishaps of their own, are discharged from the air corps. In an aerial display during graduation, Craig parachutes out of a plane but gets his chute caught on the tail end of the aircraft.  Jinx, watching from the ground, confiscates an aircraft and flies to his rescue. For his heroic actions, Jinx is reinstated and wins back Linda's affections.

Cast

 Bud Abbott as Blackie Benson
 Lou Costello as Heathcliff
 Martha Raye as Gloria Phelps / Barbara Phelps
 Carol Bruce as Linda Joyce
 William Gargan as Craig Morrison
 Dick Foran as Jinx Roberts
 Charles Lang as Jim Joyce
 William Davidson as Gonigle
 Truman Bradley as Butch
 Loring Smith as Maj. Barstow
 William Forrest as Colonel
 Freddie Slack as Pianist

Production
Keep 'Em Flying was filmed at the Cal-Aero Academy in Ontario, California from September 5-October 29, 1941 under the working title Up in the Air.  Costello's brother Pat Costello was used as Lou's stunt double. Cinematographer Elmer Dyer filmed the aerial sequences with Paul Mantz looking after the aerial "stunts".

Although Keep 'Em Flying was filmed after Ride 'Em Cowboy, the film was released first to coincide with the War Department's Keep 'Em Flying Week.

Reception
Reviews from critics were generally not as positive as those for previous Abbott and Costello films. Bosley Crowther of The New York Times found (the), "routine and sticky" plot overly intrusive on the duo's antics and concluded that "As sustained entertainment ... 'Keep 'Em Flying' doesn't heed its own advice. Too often it hits the ground with a dull, resounding plop."

Variety wrote: "'Keep 'Em Flying' is the fourth release starring Abbott and Costello within a 10-month stretch. It indicates that the boys are appearing too often with their burlycue type of roustabout comedy to remain in public popularity for any length of time, unless new material is provided for their screen appearances. Too many of the numerous laugh routines displayed here are only slight variations of previous material, with resultant loss of audience reaction." However, Film Daily reported: "Easily as good as before and maybe funnier, Abbott & Costello score again in another laugh-fest that's primed for top grosses."

Harrison's Reports wrote, "Here's another Abbott and Costello picture that will set audiences roaring with laughter." John Mosher of The New Yorker called the film "a bit too usual. Many may even feel that the Costello squeal is getting feebler."

Diabolique magazine in 2019 argued it was the only one of Lubin's films with the duo that was not "first rate entertainment."

Re-release
Keep 'Em Flying was re-released by Realart Pictures with Ride 'Em Cowboy in 1949, and with Buck Privates in 1953.

Home media
Keep 'Em Flying has been released twice on DVD.  The first time, on The Best of Abbott and Costello Volume One, on February 10, 2004, and again on October 28, 2008 as part of Abbott and Costello: The Complete Universal Pictures Collection.

References

Notes

Citations

Bibliography

 Dick, Bernard F. City of Dreams: The Making and Remaking of Universal Pictures. Lexington, Kentucky: Kentucky University Press, 1997. .
 Farmer, James H. Celluloid Wings: The Impact of Movies on Aviation (1st ed.). Blue Ridge Summit, Pennsylvania: TAB Books 1984. .
 Furmanek, Bob and Ron Palumbo. Abbott and Costello in Hollywood. New York: Perigee Books, 1991. .
 Mulholland, 'Jim. The Abbott and Costello Book. New York: Popular Library, 1977. .
 Paris, Michael. From the Wright Brothers to Top gun: Aviation, Nationalism, and Popular Cinema. Manchester, UK: Manchester University Press, 1995. .
 Pendo, Stephen. Aviation in the Cinema. Lanham, Maryland: Scarecrow Press, 1985. .
 Wynne, H. Hugh. The Motion Picture Stunt Pilots and Hollywood's Classic Aviation Movies. Missoula, Montana: Pictorial Histories Publishing Co., 1987. .

External links

 
 

1941 films
Abbott and Costello films
American black-and-white films
Films directed by Arthur Lubin
American aviation films
Military humor in film
Universal Pictures films
1941 comedy films
1940s English-language films
1940s American films